To Live Forever is a science fiction novel by American writer Jack Vance, first published in 1956.  In the Vance Integral Edition, it was retitled  Clarges.

Plot summary

The city of Clarges in the future is a near-utopia, surrounded by barbarism throughout the rest of the world.  Abundant resources and the absence of political conflict lead to a pleasant life that should be stress-free.  However, nearly everyone is obsessed with a perpetual scramble for longer life, as measured by slope.

Medical technology has led to a great lengthening of the human lifespan, but, in order to prevent the Malthusian horrors of overpopulation, it is awarded only to those citizens who have made notable contributions. Five categories have been created for those playing the life-extension game, the first four each offering an additional twenty years of life.  One's progress can be shown as a graph, whose upward direction indicates a greater likelihood of achieving the next level. Therefore, the slope of one's "lifeline" is a measure of success. A person whose lifeline reaches the vertical terminator is not merely deprived of life-lengthening treatment, they are deliberately eliminated by government operatives, known as "Assassins".

The ultimate prize is the top category, called Amaranth, which offers true immortality to the fortunate few.  People who achieve this distinction are accorded the honorific "The" in front of their name.

The Grayven Warlock was one of those few, but he has become a fugitive after a feud with another Amaranth resulted in the latter's death.  Masquerading as his own "relict" (clone) using the name Gavin Waylock, he lives in obscurity, looking for the accomplishment that will reinstate him among the immortals. However, Waylock's dramatic stratagems result in changes to society far beyond anything he had intended.

Reception
Galaxy reviewer Floyd C. Gale praised the novel as "frighteningly logical", saying that "[t]he sick, inbred society of Vance's imagination comes fully alive, even though his characters remain mere symbols."

References

External links

1956 American novels
Novels by Jack Vance
1956 science fiction novels
American science fiction novels
Ballantine Books books
Novels about cloning